Inqulab Zindabbad is a 1971 Indian Malayalam film, directed by K. S. Sethumadhavan and produced by K. S. R. Moorthy. The film stars Sathyan, Madhu, Sheela and Jayabharathi in the lead roles. The film had musical score by G. Devarajan.

Cast

Sathyan as Venugopalan
Madhu as Shreedharan
Sheela as Rajamma
Jayabharathi as Vasanthi
Adoor Bhasi as Panjali Raman Nair
Prema as Devaki 
Sankaradi as Neerkunnam Neelaambaran
Shobha as As Child artist
Varghese
G. K. Pillai as Circle Inspector
Janardanan
Kuttan Pillai
Menon
N. Govindankutty as District Secretary
Nambiar
Nellikode Bhaskaran as Govindan
P. O. Thomas
Panicker
Panjabi
Paravoor Bharathan as Head Constable Mathan
Philomina as Narayani     
Roja Ramani
Susheela
Vasu
Veeran as Adv. Cherian

Soundtrack
The music was composed by G. Devarajan and the lyrics were written by O. V. Usha and Vayalar Ramavarma.

References

External links
 

1971 films
1970s Malayalam-language films
Films directed by K. S. Sethumadhavan